Almost Pyaar with DJ Mohabbat is a 2023 Indian Hindi-language musical romantic drama film written and directed by Anurag Kashyap
. starring Alaya F and newcomer Karan Mehta in the lead role. The film had its world premiere at the 2022 Marrakech Film Festival and Asian premiere at the Hainan Island International Film Festival. Post release , the film was praised by the audiences too.

Cast
 Karan Mehta as Yakub/ Harmeet
 Alaya F as Amrita/ Ayesha
 Vicky Kaushal as DJ Mohabbat (Special appearance)
 Navnindra Behl

Soundtrack 
The score and songs are composed by Amit Trivedi and songs is written by lyricist Shellee.

Soundtrack

Reception
Ganesh Aalgave of Firstpost rated the film 3.5 out of 5 stars and termed the film as a "cinematic treat" if we will love the unconventional take on rom-com, praised the performances of Alaya,Mehta and also the cameo of Kaushal. Shubhra Gupta of The Indian Express rated the film 3 out of 5 and wrote "Despite a few fumbles, both the leads are impressive. Kashyap’s singular ability to show us the dark side of putative romance– the ‘almost pyaar’ of the title– rescues the film, and tilts it back on its axis". Titas Chowdhury of News 18 rated the film 3 out of 5 stars and wrote that the film "isn’t one of Anurag’s better works, but it surely has a heart". Grace Cyril of India Today rated the film 3 out of 5 and wrote that the film is filled with a "whole lot of love and the efforts show". Ronak Kotecha of The Times of India rated the film 3 out of 5 stars and wrote "It’s a love story fraught with regular societal challenges and clichés, told in a unique way. But beyond that it falls woefully short of making this film an entertaining and a deeply engaging experience".

References

External links

2020s Hindi-language films
Indian musical drama films
Indian romantic drama films